Ori Ire is a Local Government Area in Oyo State, Nigeria. Its headquarters are in the town of Ikoyi.

It has an area of 2,116 km and a population of 150,628 at the 2006 census.

The postal code of the area is 210.

References

Local Government Areas in Oyo State